After My Time is the debut studio album by American R&B singer Noel Gourdin. It was released by Epic Records on July 22, 2008. The album includes the single "The River".

Critical reception 

AllMusic editor Andy Kellman found that while "even the productions that are synth-spiked or more hip-hop-oriented [...] don't register as flagrant attempts to top the pop chart; yet, at the same time, they add a necessary dimension and another level of appeal to Gourdin's debut." Boston Globe critic Siddhartha Mitter called After My Time an "album of assured R&B for grown folks." She remarked that "at 13 songs, the program is concise and there's little filler - this is an album worth hearing in full [...] He's a real singer, with texture and control."

Track listing  

Sample credits
"The River" contains sampled elements from "How Do You Feel the Morning After?" as performed by Millie Jackson.

Charts

References 

2008 debut albums
Albums produced by Brian Kennedy (record producer)
Albums produced by Dre & Vidal
Epic Records albums